Afonin is a Russian surname derived from Afonya, a short form of the name Afanasy. The surname literally means Afonya's. It may refer to:

 Mikhail Afonin (born 1957), Russian football coach
 Vadim Afonin (born 1987), Uzbek-Russian footballer
 Valentin Afonin (1939–2021), Soviet footballer
 Vasily Afonin (1919–1996), Soviet military aviator
 Vyacheslav Afonin (born 1978), Russian football coach
 Yury Afonin (born 1977), Russian politician

Russian-language surnames